Sasa (also known as Salai Maung Taing San), known honorifically as Dr Sasa, is a Chin medical doctor, philanthropist and civil society activist who currently serves as the Minister of International Cooperation in the cabinet of National Unity Government. He previously served as the Special Envoy of Committee Representing Pyidaungsu Hluttaw (CRPH) to the United Nations. He is the founder of Health and Hope, a Christian health organization that works with churches to promote development in Chin State and trains villagers to become community health workers. Sasa has been recognised as one of the "Tearfund's Inspired Individuals" for his contributions in Myanmar.

Early life and education
Sasa was born circa 1980s in Lailenpi Town, Matupi District, Chin State. His name, Sasa, was given by his grandmother which means 'higher and higher' in Chin tradition. After he completed his secondary education from a high school in Yangon where he had to walk for two weeks to attend, he volunteered to improve education of his hometown.

Sasa was sent to Shillong College in India with the support of his community in 1996. There he quest for a scholarship through Prospect Burma from which he met with Genette Dagtoglou who sponsored him to study medicine at Yerevan State Medical University, Armenia. He is a Christian.

Career

Humanitarian work
In 2007 his final year as a medical student, Sasa brought medical help and treated over 3,500 patients in towns where famine struck, including his hometown.
When he graduated in 2009, Sasa started teaching primary healthcare to villagers, and founded Health and Hope Christian organization. The region's first primary healthcare service centre, Health and Hope works with local churches to train two community health workers each from 150 villages. The organization counts Charles III among its patrons.

He also managed to construct Lailenpi airstrip, the first private airport in Chin State.

Politics
In 2020, Sasa became a leading member of Chin State NLD's election committee for the general election. A fresh face in politics, his involvement in election campaigning in Chin State in November made him known to the wider public across Myanmar.

In the midnight of 1 February 2021, he was together with Aung San Suu Kyi before the coup. He ran away to India from the border and evaded the arrest of the military, pretending to be a taxi driver. It was a three day journey to get to safety.

On 22 February 2021, he was appointed as CRPH's Special Envoy to the United Nations. A few days later, on 4 March 2021, he submitted a letter to the United Nations Security Council requesting the international body to honour its Responsibility to Protect (R2P) commitments with reference to the 2021 Myanmar protests and the violent military response to them.

On 16 April 2021, he was appointed as the Minister of International Cooperation in the cabinet of newly formed National Unity Government by the members of CRPH.

Lawsuit 
According to a statement from the Myanmar Police Force, Dr Sasa (a) Sasa San (a) Tai Sa lived in Lailinpe town, Matupi Township, Chin State, has been charged under the law. The Dekkhina District Court has issued an arrest warrant on 15 March. He was charged under Section 122 (2) of the Criminal Code for high treason as he had accepted the appointment of Myanmar Representative to the United Nations by the Committee Representing Pyidaungsu Hluttaw (CRPH).

References

External links

Living people
Burmese Christians
Burmese activists
Burmese politicians
21st-century Burmese physicians
People from Chin State
Yerevan State Medical University alumni
Year of birth missing (living people)
21st-century Burmese politicians